The 1952 Texas Tech Red Raiders football team represented Texas Technological College—now known as Texas Tech University—as a member of the Border Conference during the 1952 college football season. Led by second-year head coach DeWitt Weaver, the Red Raiders compiled an overall record of 3–7–1 with a mark of 2–1–1 in conference play, placing second in the Border Conference.

Schedule

References

Texas Tech
Texas Tech Red Raiders football seasons
Texas Tech Red Raiders football